The 2019 World Enduro Championship is the 30th season of the FIM World Enduro Championship. The season consists of seven events.

Steve Holcombe goes into the championship after winning both the EnduroGP and Enduro 3 classes in 2018. Brad Freeman is the reigning Enduro 1 champion, with Eero Remes going into the season after taking the Enduro 2 title last year. 
A new class, the Enduro Open World Cup, will be contested for the first time in 2019. The aim of the class is to increase the number of privateer competitors.

Calendar
A seven-round calendar was announced.

EnduroGP

Riders Championship

Enduro 1

Riders Championship

Enduro 2

Riders Championship

Enduro 3

Riders Championship

Junior

Riders Championship

Junior 1

Riders Championship

Junior 2

Riders Championship

Youth

Riders Championship

Women

Calendar

Entry List

Riders Championship

Open World Cup

Open 2-Stroke

Riders Championship

Open 4-Stroke

Riders Championship

References 

FIM Enduro World Championship